Bishop Rawstorne Church of England Academy (formerly Bishop Rawstorne CofE Language College) is a coeducational secondary school with academy status situated in the village of Croston, Lancashire, England.

About the school 
Bishop Rawstorne was founded in the early 1960s. Pupils are drawn from a wide area, and the school is over-subscribed every year. The school was awarded a DfES Teacher Training rating in late 2000 by the then Secretary of State for Education, David Blunkett MP. The school caters to ages 11 to 16, ranging from year 7 to 11. After the final year, pupils can pursue further education or get a modern apprenticeship or employment. In January 2008 there were 933 pupils.

The school is a small campus containing a main block (which includes the main hall, cafeteria, maths, IT, foreign languages and humanities departments), a science block, technology block, administrative block (music, RE, geography and learning support) and English block. A recent extension of the music department (opened by Paul McKenna, captain of Preston North End) allowed the opening of a music school and a new road was constructed to ease congestion.

Performance 
According to a 2021 OFSTED report, the school's' performance was rated as 'good' a downgrading from the previous 2007 rating of 'outstanding'. In 2008 the school had 29% A* to A grades earning a rank of 35, down on the previous year of 34% with a rank of 11. However, 2009 saw an increase to 42.5% A*/A grades, improving rank to 8. Scores are usually above average in the country and in local league tables. The school has increasingly high GCSE grades, where in 2007 the school attained 84% A*-C grades, compared to 58% in 2001, making it within the top 10% of UK schools. The school's performance continued upwards and by 2010, it attained 90.1% A*-C grades (85% A*-C inc. English & Maths).
In 2018 the school achieved a 91% standard pass in English Language and Maths (9-4 grades), an improvement of 4.5% on the scores from 2017. In addition 72% of students achieved a strong pass in both subjects (9-5 grades). Furthermore in English Language and Maths respectively, 47.5% and 30.7% of students achieved a 7-9 grade, equivalent to an A* or A grade previously.

Religious ethos 
The school, which is in the Diocese of Blackburn, has a strong Church of England religious emphasis. In 2007 the school was rated highly in a denominational report. The school has a chaplaincy team made up of priests from the Church of England. It is a Christian school with Christian values.

National Teaching School status 
In March 2012 the Academy was selected for a new role.

At that time, Bishop Rawstorne was one of only about 100 schools in England to be granted Teaching School status in the second cohort of applications.

Language College status 
The schools' specialist language status was awarded in 1996. Language exchanges have taken place between Bishop Rawstorne and foreign schools, since twinning with Collège Honoré de Balzac, Azay-le-Rideau, France, in 1982 and a foreign exchange in 1985. The school taught compulsory French and German to year 11, and Spanish starting in year 7 (2009-) with an option to continue to GCSE level. Other languages such as Japanese, Italian, Chinese, Russian, Swedish, Magyar and Polish were available as extra-curricular activities. The school undertakes various trips abroad to Europe each year for years 7, 9 and 10. The school has won awards for its language status, including the International School Award in 2004, awarded by the Department for Education and Skills and the British Council. In 2006 the school successfully applied to participate in the Connecting Classrooms project, which involves linking UK schools with schools in Mozambique and Uganda. Since the school became an academy in 2011 the school has decreased the number of languages on offer as they no longer had their language college status. Since 2017 the school has taught only German to students.

Academy status 
As of 2011 the high school was changed from a Language College to an Academy which has given the school more freedom of curriculum choice.

Controversies 

In July 2020 the head teacher, Paul Cowley, sent a circular letter to parents accusing their children of not engaging or working hard enough during the lockdown imposed in the UK as the result of the COVID-19 pandemic.  Parents complained to the press that the school had failed to provide adequate online teaching over the same period. Parents also complained that the letter was accusing them for not engaging their children (blaming them for the schools failing); one parent in particular complained that he was a key worker who had worked 'tirelessly' in a hospital and did not have time to help his child engage, something the school did not appreciate. In several cases, the letter was sent to parents of autistic children.

References

External links
 Bishop Rawstorne official website

Educational institutions established in the 1960s
1960s establishments in England
Schools in the Borough of Chorley
Academies in Lancashire
Secondary schools in Lancashire
Church of England secondary schools in the Diocese of Blackburn
Croston